Perittia mucronata is a moth of the family Elachistidae. It is found in Greece.

References

External links
lepiforum.de

Moths described in 2001
Elachistidae
Moths of Europe